In mathematics, mimetic interpolation is a method for interpolating differential forms. In contrast to other interpolation methods, which estimate a field at a location given its values on neighboring points, mimetic interpolation estimates the field's -form given the field's projection on neighboring grid elements.

Mimetic interpolation is particularly relevant in the context of vector and pseudo-vector fields as the method conserves line integrals and fluxes, respectively.

Interpolation of integrated forms 
Let  be a differential -form, then mimetic interpolation is the linear combination

An important advantage of mimetic interpolation over other interpolation methods is that the field strengths  are scalars and thus coordinate system invariant.

Interpolating forms 
In many cases it is desirable for the interpolating forms  to pick the field's strength on particular grid elements without interference from other . This allows one to assign field values to specific grid elements, which can then be interpolated in-between. A common case is linear interpolation for which the interpolating functions (-forms) are zero on all nodes except on one, where the interpolating function is one. A similar construct can be applied to mimetic interpolation

For  this amounts to  where  is a grid point. For  the integral is over  edges and hence the integral  is zero expect on edge .

Conservation properties 
Mimetic interpolation respects the properties of differential forms. In particular, Stokes' theorem

This confers to mimetic interpolation conservation properties, which are not generally shared by other interpolation methods.

Commutativity between the interpolation operator and the exterior derivative 

To be mimetic, the interpolation must satisfy

where  is the interpolation operator of a -form, i.e.  . In other words, the interpolation operators and the exterior derivatives commute. Note that different interpolation methods are required for each type of form, . The above equation is all that is needed to satisfy Stokes' theorem for the interpolated form

For instance,

The last step gives zero since  when integrated over the boundary .

Projection 

The interpolated  is often projected onto a target, -dimensional, oriented manifolds ,For  the target is a point, for  it is a line, for  an area, etc.

Applications 
Many physical fields can be represented as -forms. When discretizing fields in numerical modeling, each type of -form often acquires its own staggering in accordance with numerical stability requirements, e.g. the need to prevent the checkerboard instability. This led to the development of the exterior finite element and discrete exterior calculus methods, both of which rely on a field discretization that are compatible with the field type.

The table below lists some examples of physical fields, their type, their corresponding form and interpolation interpolation method, as well as software that can be leveraged to interpolate, remap or regrid the field:

Example 

Consider quadrilateral cells in two dimensions with their node indexed  in the counterclockwise direction. Further, let  and  be the parametric coordinates of each cell. Then

The corresponding  edge interpolating forms are

were we assumed the edges to be indexed in counterclockwise direction and with the edges pointing to the east and north.

where  is the wedge product.

Take for instance,

Likewise, we have

Note that  is also known as the pullback. For a general 1-form , one gets .

References

Interpolation
Differential forms